Two Fervent-class destroyers served with the Royal Navy.

As was typical for torpedo craft at the time, the Admiralty left detailed design to the builders, laying down only broad requirements.

Their locomotive (later Reed) boilers generated  which produced a top speed of between 26 and 27 knots. As was usual with ships of their type, they carried one 12-pounder, two torpedo tubes and had a complement of 53 officers and men.

Both ships served in home waters.  They originally were designed with one funnel but when they failed to reach their contract speed they were reboilered with four funnels.  Due to these problems, the ships did not leave their builders until 1901.

In September 1913 the Admiralty re-classed all the surviving 27-knotter destroyers, including Fervent and Zephyr as A Class destroyers.

See also
A-class destroyer (1913)

References

 

Destroyer classes
 
Ship classes of the Royal Navy